The 2014 FIBA Asia Under-18 Championship qualification was held in late 2013 and early 2014 with the Gulf region, West Asia, Southeast Asia, East Asia, Central Asia and South Asia each conducting tournaments.

Qualification format
The following are eligible to participate:

 The organizing country.
 The champion team from the previous FIBA Asia Under-18 Championship.
 The four best-placed teams from the previous FIBA Asia Under-18 Championship will qualify the same number of teams from their respective sub-zones.
 The two best teams from the sub-zones.

2012 FIBA Asia Under-18 Championship

Qualified teams

* Only 5 teams registered from East Asia.

Central Asia
The 2014 CABA Under-18 Championship  was held at June 12, 2014 in Taraz, Kazakhstan. The winner teams qualifies for 2014 FIBA Asia Under-18 Championship.

East Asia
All the others withdrew, so ,,, qualified automatically.

Gulf
The   2013 GCC Youth Basketball Championship was held at Dubai, United Arab Emirates from September 3 to 7 2013. The three best teams qualifies for 2014 FIBA Asia Under-18 Championship.

South Asia
The 2014 SABA Under-18 Championship  was held at Bengaluru, India from July 5 to 7, 2014. The winner teams qualifies for 2014 FIBA Asia Under-18 Championship.

Southeast Asia

The 9th SEABA Under-18 Championship was held at Sabah, Malaysia from May 5 to 7 2014. The two best teams qualifies for 2014 FIBA Asia Under-18 Championship.

West Asia
The 2013 West Asian Under-17 Championshipand The 2014 West Asian Youth Basketball Championship was held at Tehran, Iran and Amman, Jordan from August 19 to 21, 2013 and July 10 to 12, 2014 . The three best teams qualifies for 2014 FIBA Asia Under-18 Championship.

References

FIBA Asia Under-18 Championship qualification
2014 FIBA Asia Under-18 Championship
2013–14 in Asian basketball